Thodiyoor  is a village in Kollam district in the state of Kerala, India.

Demographics- Census 2011 Data

 India census, Thodiyoor had a population of 23123 with 11244 males and 11879 females. The famous temple Malumel Sree Bhagavathi is located in this village.

References

http://www.census2011.co.in/data/town/628366-thodiyoor-kerala.html

Villages in Kollam district